Congenital hearing loss is a hearing loss present at birth. It can include hereditary hearing loss or hearing loss due to other factors present either in-utero (prenatal) or at the time of birth.

Genetic factors 

Genetic factors are thought to cause more than 50% of all incidents of congenital hearing loss. Genetic hearing loss may be autosomal dominant, autosomal recessive, or X-linked (related to the sex chromosome).

Hearing loss

Autosomal dominant hearing loss 

In autosomal dominant hearing loss, one parent who carries the dominant gene for hearing loss and typically has a hearing loss passes it on to the child. In this case there is at least a 50% probability that the child will also have a hearing loss. The probability is higher if both parents have the dominant gene (and typically both have a hearing loss) or if both grandparents on one side of the family have hearing loss due to genetic causes. Because at least one parent usually has a hearing loss, there is prior expectation that the child may have a hearing loss. Autosomal dominant congenital hearing loss can be attributed to such causes like Waardenburg Syndrome.

Autosomal recessive hearing loss 

In autosomal recessive hearing loss, both parents who typically have normal hearing, carry a recessive gene. In this case the probability of the child having a hearing loss is 25%. Because both parents usually have normal hearing, and because no other family members have hearing loss, there is no prior expectation that the child may have a hearing loss.

X-linked hearing loss 

In X-linked hearing loss, the mother carries the recessive trait for hearing loss on the sex chromosome.  She can pass on the trait to males and female children, but usually only male children are affected.

There are some genetic syndromes, in which hearing loss is one of the known characteristics. Some examples are Down syndrome (aneuploidy), Usher syndrome (autosomal recessive), Treacher Collins syndrome (autosomal dominant), Crouzon syndrome (autosomal dominant), and Alport syndrome (X-linked).

Other causes of congenital hearing loss 

Other causes of congenital hearing loss that are not hereditary in nature include prenatal infections, illnesses, toxins consumed by the mother during pregnancy or other conditions occurring at the time of birth or shortly thereafter. These conditions typically cause sensorineural hearing loss ranging from mild to profound in degree.

Interventions 
A child with a congenital hearing loss should begin receiving intervention before 6 months of age. Studies suggest that children who receive early interventions are better able to develop communication skills (using spoken or sign language). Once a child is diagnosed, doctors or the audiologists can counsel the family and provide options for intervention. In the United States of America, because of a Federal law (the Individuals with Disabilities Education Act), children with a hearing loss between birth and 3 years of age have the right to receive interdisciplinary assessment and early intervention services at little or no cost. After age 3, early intervention and special education programs are provided through the public school system.

Surgery may be recommended if a child has a permanent conductive hearing loss caused by malformations of the outer or middle ear, or by repeated ear infections. Although fluid in the middle ear usually results in only temporary hearing loss, chronic ear infection can cause a child to fall behind in language skills. In some cases, a doctor may suggest inserting a tube through the eardrum to allow the middle ear to drain. This procedure generally does not require an overnight hospital stay.

There are a number of intervention options available for hearing loss, and parents will need to decide which are most appropriate for their child. They will need to consider the child’s age, developmental level and personality, the severity of the hearing loss, as well as their own preferences. Ideally a team of experts including the child’s primary care provider, an otolaryngologist, a speech-language pathologist, audiologist and an educator will work closely with the parents to create an Individualized Family Service Plan. Treatment plans can be changed as the child gets older.

Children as young as 4 weeks of age can benefit from a hearing aid. These devices amplify sound, making it possible for many children to hear spoken words and develop spoken language. However, some children with severe to profound hearing loss may not be able to hear enough sound, even with a hearing aid, to make speech audible. A behind-the-ear hearing aid is often recommended for young children because it is safer and more easily fitted and adjusted as the child grows as compared to one that fits within the ear. Today a variety of good quality hearing aids are available – analog or digital body worn (for small children) or ear level for older children. When fitting a hearing aid, a competent audiologist has to assess the child's residual hearing, look at the hearing aid's performance and fit the child with an appropriate instrument. Equally important is the ear mold, which has to be custom made to suit the shape of the child's ear.

If a child has profound deafness, the benefits of hearing aids are limited. Cochlear implants may be used instead of hearing aids. They can be surgically inserted in the inner ear of children as young as 12 months of age to stimulate hearing. The surgery requires a hospital stay of one to several days. With additional language and speech therapy, children with cochlear implants may learn to understand speech and speak reasonably well, but the amount of improvement is variable. 

Assistive devices can be used alone or paired with a hearing aid or cochlear implant to aid listening in difficult or noisy environments.

In the United States of America, the type preferred by most deaf adults is American Sign Language (ASL), which has rules and grammar that is distinct from English. There are also several variations of sign language that can be used along with spoken English which are standard in English-speaking countries outside the United States. There is also a visual model of spoken language called cued speech.  Learning to lip read is very difficult because many sounds look the same on the lips.  Cued speech enables young children with hearing loss to clearly see what is being said, and learn spoken languages with normal grammar and vocabulary.  It clarifies lip reading using 8 hand shapes in 4 positions and usually takes less than 20 hours to learn the entire system.

Famous cases 

 Princess Alice of Battenberg
 Deaf white cats

References 
American Speech-Language-Hearing Association. Hearing Treatment and Rehabilitation, Rockville, MD, February 12, 2002.
Boys Town National Research Hospital. Information on Hearing Loss, Omaha, NE, February 12, 2002.
Centers for Disease Control and Prevention. The Early Hearing Detection and Intervention Program, Atlanta, GA, February 7, 2002.
The Decibels Foundation. Helping children with hearing loss and their families live happier lives.
National Center for Hearing Assessment and Management. Early Hearing Detection and Intervention Programs, Utah State University, Logan, UT, February 7, 2002.
Parchment Hill Causes of Congenital Hearing Loss
Texas Newborn Hearing Screening Program
Alaska Universal Newborn Hearing Screening
Michigan Hearing Screening Program
 NHS Newborn Hearing Screening Programme 

Hearing loss